The Adelaide Hills Hawks are a soccer club from the Adelaide Hills, South Australia. Adelaide Hills play in the FFSA State League 1 and are based out of The Hawks Nest, Woodside in the Adelaide Hills. Formed in 1991, the club is still quite young in comparison to other clubs throughout the SA. The Hawks field sides in the Junior Premier League and have a Junior Academy which has produced several Senior players.

History
The Adelaide Hills Soccer Club was formed in 1991 by the Adelaide Hills Junior Soccer Association. In its first year of operation the club fielded only one team in the U/16 age group. John VanDerveeken Snr played a large role in bringing together players from all over the hills for the next 5 years. Before this time talented junior players had to travel to the city to further their soccer career.

In 1995 the club entered teams in the U/19 and U/23 competitions. The U/19 team, coached by John VanDerveeken Snr, won the competition and included future 1st team players such as Justin Gallagher, Daryl Harvey, Nathan Kaisler, Anthony Farina, Scott Blakemore, Jason Wegener, Erima Gallasch and a young (future Captain) Simon Wegner. Much of this team had played together in AHJSA junior teams (U12's to U16's).  Darryl Harvey won the Rab Jones Medal for the most outstanding player in the U19 State League.
The U/23 side by comparison was a mixture of players from different clubs. At times U/19 players would suit up again for another game.

In 1996 many of the U/19 premiership team moved into the U/23. They were joined by several slightly older AHJSA players who had Senior Amateur, State League and Premier League experience. These players included Shane Jones, Simon Dawe, David Buckley, Phil Yeardley and Doug Montgomery. The team was coached by John VanDerveeken Snr. The team made the finals but lost to Cumberland in the semi-final after dominating the first half.
During 1997 and 1998 the team was training at Dunn Park in Mount Barker. The venue was a football/cricket oval (with concrete pitch), with a tiny uninsulated shed as a change room, with no showers except a hose outside to wash off the mud before going home or to 'Giovanni's' for pizza. Training conditions didn't dampen enthusiasm and the growing confidence within the team and club, instead it seem to strengthen the idea that we did deserve to play 'Senior' soccer in the State League, because we were being successful even without great training facilities.

In 1997 Craig Leith came to the club after coaching the Cumberland U/23 the previous year. Leith had a strong link to the Hills already, knew the players and saw the talent that was there. The team was unbeaten all year. It was a strong message to the competition that we would be competitive in 1st grade football. Robert Laverty...  Andy Thomson... Justin Gallagher B&F Les Alagich Medalist...

In 1998 it entered a senior team into the SASF State League finishing 6th, one game out of the finals. The team was very competitive and had self-belief. For many this was their first time playing senior football of any kind. The team was a majority of the U23 Premiership team from the year before. Captain Shane Jones, GK Nathan Kaisler, Simon Dawe, David Buckley, Doug Montgomery, Scott Blakemore, Ivan Clarke, Justin Gallagher, Anthony Farina, Simon Wegener, Darryl Harvey, GK Ben Bridal...   Joining these former players from other clubs included Garth Thompson, Andy Kay, Dave Forster, Paul Cassembohm, Rick Callisto, Chip 
Melbourne end of season trip (be careful what you say!)

In 2002 the club acquired an area in the Woodside Complex in the Adelaide Hills and is gradually developing a first class pitch and clubrooms. Peter Winter, the newly appointed groundsman, managed to transform the pitch surface from a patchy low grade ground to a pitch that now competes with the best. Woodside boasts the largest pitch in South Australia and has also developed its junior pitch, with the addition of a warm up pitch. Seating will also be constructed along the side-line.

In 2004 the young club surprised everyone when it won promotion to the Premier League. The club considered remaining in the State League as it believed it was not ready for the Premier League and would not be competitive as it did not pay its senior players. However it opted to move up into the Premier League in order to gain valuable experience for its very young side. Adelaide Hills performed well in the Premier League, but as expected, they finished last and were relegated. The experience was a valuable one with a number of younger hawks remaining at the club and proceeding to play in the following season for the first team.

The 2011 Season saw the introduction of new first team Coach Doug Paterson. The Hawks struggled to make a positive impact with their new coach and were unluckily relegated on the final day of the season into the State League competition for season 2012. Paterson has managed to lead the club in a positive direction, re-building the Senior team with the elevation of several young players into the starting 11.

Players

First team squad

Club honours
 State League 2 Grand Final Winners: 2019
 State League 2 League Champions: 2019
 State League 1 Champions: 2008
 State League 1 Grand Final Winners 2008
 State League Grand Finalist: 2004

References

External links
 Official Website
 Official Hawks Archive

Hills
Association football clubs established in 1991
1991 establishments in Australia